is a Japanese voice actor from Tokorozawa, Saitama.

Filmography

Anime
Captain (Anime) - Marui
Captain (film) - Marui
Captain (special) - Marui
Star Blazers: The Comet Empire - Child
Toki no Tabibito -Time Stranger- - Nobuccho Yamazaki

Dubbing Roles

Live Action television
Goosebumps - Skipper Matthews (Dan Warry-Smith) in episode: Attack of the Mutant Parts I & II 
The Cosby Show (Theo) (Malcolm-Jamal Warner)
The Heights (Stan Lee) (Alex Désert)

Live Action films
Dirty Harry (Additional voice) (VHS/DVD versions)

References

External links

1967 births
Living people
Japanese male video game actors
Japanese male voice actors
Male voice actors from Saitama Prefecture
People from Tokorozawa, Saitama